Carrington training ground can refer to:

the training ground of Manchester United F.C. at the Trafford Training Centre
the training ground of Manchester City F.C. at the Carrington Training Centre
the training ground of Sale Sharks rugby club